Lunde is a village in Kristiansand municipality in Agder county, Norway. The village is located along the European route E39 highway and along the river Lundeelva. The village is surrounded by several other villages that together form the greater Søgne urban area.

The village of Lunde was the administrative centre of Søgne municipality until 1974 when it was moved to neighboring Tangvall.  Lunde is also the site of the "new" Søgne Church which was built in 1861 to replace the Old Søgne Church located a few kilometers away.  There is also an elementary school in Lunde.

As a part of the greater Søgne urban area, separate population statistics are not tracked for Lunde.

References

Villages in Agder
Geography of Kristiansand